Ali Mahmud (also Romanized as ‘Ālī Maḩmūd, Ali Mahmood, Ālī Maḩmūd, and Āl Mahmūd) is a village in Pachehlak-e Sharqi Rural District, in the Central District of Aligudarz County, Lorestan Province, Iran. At the 2006 census, its population was 205, in 35 families.

References 

Towns and villages in Aligudarz County